Liceo Español Cervantes, named for Miguel de Cervantes, is a Spanish international school in Gianicolo, Rome, Italy, operated by the Spanish Ministry of Education. It serves classes from primary school up to the bachillerato level. It is owned by the Spanish government and was established in 1973.

See also

Italian international schools in Spain:
 Istituto Italiano Statale Comprensivo di Barcellona
 Scuola Statale Italiana di Madrid

References

External links
 Liceo Español Cervantes 

International schools in Rome
Rome
1973 establishments in Italy
Educational institutions established in 1973
Secondary schools in Italy